Two ships of the Royal Navy have been named HMS Satyr, after the figure from mythology:

She served in the First World War and was broken up in 1926.
  was an S-class submarine, launched on 28 September 1942 and which served in the Second World War.  She was lent to the French Navy and renamed Saphir, and scrapped in April 1962.

Royal Navy ship names